Octamethylcyclotetrasiloxane, also called D4, is an organosilicon compound with the formula . It is a colorless viscous liquid. It is a common cyclomethicone. It is widely used in cosmetics.

Production and polymerization
Commercially D4 is produced from dimethyldichlorosilane. Hydrolysis of the dichloride produces a mixture of cyclic dimethylsiloxanes and polydimethylsiloxane. From this mixture, the cyclic siloxanes including D4 can be removed by distillation. In the presence of a strong base such as KOH, the polymer/ring mixture is equilibrated, allowing complete conversion to the more volatile cyclic siloxanes:

D4 and D5 are also precursors to the polymer. The catalyst is again KOH.

Occurrence
It is among the most important of all the cyclic siloxanes, with a global production volume of 136 million kilograms in 1993.
100,000–1,000,000 tonnes per year of D4 is manufactured and/or imported in the European Economic Area.

Safety and environmental considerations 

D4 is of low acute toxicity. The LC50 for a single four hour inhalation exposure in rats is 36 mg/L. The oral LD50 in rats is above 4800 mg/kg and the dermal LD50in rats is above 2400 mg/kg.

As the smallest cyclic dimethylsiloxane that does not experience considerable ring strain, D4 is one of the most abundant siloxanes in the environment, e.g. in landfill gases. D4 and D5 have attracted attention because they are pervasive. Cyclic siloxanes can be detected in some species of aquatic life. An independent, peer-reviewed study in the US found "negligible risk from D4 to organisms" while a scientific assessment by the Australian government stated, "the direct risks to aquatic life from exposure to these chemicals at expected surface water concentrations are not likely to be significant."

In the European Union, D4 was characterized as a substance of very high concern (SVHC) due to its PBT and vPvB properties and was thus included in the candidate list for authorisation. D4 shall not be placed on the market in wash-off cosmetic products in a concentration equal to or greater than 0.1% by weight of either substance, after 31 January 2020. Conversely, a detailed review and analysis of the science by the State of Washington in 2017 led to the removal of D4 from their CHCC listing. That decision prompted the State of Oregon to follow suit in 2018.

See also
 Hexamethylcyclotrisiloxane (D3)
 Decamethylcyclopentasiloxane (D5)

References

External links 
 

PBT substances
Siloxanes